Azmar Airlines was a charter airline based in Sulaymaniyah, Iraqi Kurdistan. It was founded in 2005 and meanwhile went out of business.

Destinations 
As of 2012, Azmar Airlines offered services to the following destinations:

Düsseldorf - Düsseldorf Airport
Munich - Munich Airport

Erbil - Erbil International Airport
Sulaimaniyah - Sulaimaniyah International Airport base

Stockholm - Stockholm-Arlanda Airport

Fleet 
The Azmar Airlines fleet consisted of the following aircraft as of December 2013: 

 1 Boeing 737-200
 2 McDonnell Douglas DC-9 (operated by Jet Tran Air)

References

External links 
 
 Azmar Airlines Fleet
 "Profile for: Azmar Airlines" Aero Transport Data Bank
 "Fly Air begins direct Istanbul-Erbil, Sulaimaniyah flights" Kerkuk.net
 "A former pilot, establishing charter company" Nacional
 "Welcome to Bayad Group!" Bayad Group

Defunct airlines of Iraq
Airlines established in 2005
Airlines disestablished in 2012
Defunct charter airlines
Iraqi companies established in 2005
2012 disestablishments in Iraq